The One Hundred Twelfth Ohio General Assembly was the legislative body of the state of Ohio in 1977 and 1978. In this General Assembly, the Ohio Senate and Ohio House of Representatives were controlled by the Democratic Party.  In the Senate, there were 21 Democrats and 12 Republicans. In the House, there were 66 Democrats and 33 Republicans. It used redistricted legislative districts based on the 1970 Census. Democrats controlled the Ohio House of Representatives from January 1, 1973, through December 31, 1994, under Ohio's longest serving House Speaker, Vernal G. Riffe, (D., Scioto County).

Major events

Vacancies
January 3, 1977: Senator Don Pease (D-13th) resigns to take a seat in the United States House of Representatives.
January 3, 1978: Representative Irene Smart (D-49th) resigns.
August 14, 1978: Senator Michael Maloney (R-7th) resigns.
June 28, 1978: Representative James W. Rankin (D-25th) dies.
September 14, 1978: Representative Richard Finan (R-19th) resigns to take a seat in the Ohio Senate.

Appointments
January 3, 1977: Ronald Nabakowski is appointed to the 13th Senatorial District due to the resignation of Don Pease.
January 3, 1978: Robert Regula is appointed to the 49th House District due to the resignation of Irene Smart.
September 14, 1978: Richard Finan is appointed to the 7th Senatorial District due to the resignation of Michael Maloney.
September 14, 1978: Helen Rankin is appointed to the 25th House District due to the death of James W. Rankin.
September 14, 1978: Dale Van Vyven is appointed to the 18th House District due to the resignation of Richard Finan.

Senate

Leadership

Majority leadership
 President of the Senate: Richard Celeste
 President pro tempore of the Senate: Oliver Ocasek
 Assistant pro tempore: Morris Jackson

Minority leadership
 Leader: Michael Maloney
 Assistant Leader: Paul Gillmor
 Whip: Tom Van Meter

Members of the 112th Ohio Senate

House of Representatives

Leadership

Majority leadership
 Speaker of the House: Vern Riffe
 President pro tempore of the Senate: Barney Quilter
 Floor Leader: Bill Mallory
 Majority Whip: Tom Fries

Minority leadership
 Leader: Charles F. Kurfess
 Assistant Leader: Norman Murdock
 Whip: Alan Norris

Members of the 112th Ohio House of Representatives

Appt.- Member was appointed to current House Seat

See also
Ohio House of Representatives membership, 126th General Assembly
Ohio House of Representatives membership, 125th General Assembly
 List of Ohio state legislatures

References
Ohio House of Representatives official website
Project Vote Smart – State House of Ohio
Map of Ohio House Districts
Ohio District Maps 2002–2012
2006 election results from Ohio Secretary of State

Ohio legislative sessions
Ohio
Ohio
1977 in Ohio
1978 in Ohio